The Franklin and Megantic Railway (F&M) (original name "Franklin and Megantic Railroad") was a  narrow gauge railway in northern Maine that branches off from the Sandy River Railroad (SRR) at Strong and served sawmills in Salem township and in the town of Kingfield.

History 
The F&M was constructed in 1884 to reach aboriginal spruce forests on the south slope of Mount Abraham.  The  Mount Abram branch was constructed to Soule's sawmill in 1886.  In 1894, the F&M formed the  narrow gauge Kingfield and Dead River Railroad (K&DR) to extend rails up the Carrabassett River from Kingfield to Carrabassett.  At that time, the F&M owned 2 locomotives, 7 box cars, 21 flat cars,  combination car #1 built by the Laconia Car Company in 1885, and  baggage car #2 (renumbered #4 in 1903) built by the Portland Company in 1887.

The company was renamed to "Franklin and Megantic Railway" in 1897 due to financial problems. The owners of the Sandy River Railroad purchased controlling interest in the F&M in 1898. In 1899 the line was extended to a large sawmill in Crockertown (later called Bigelow), as close to the Canadian town of Megantic as it would reach. Twenty new flat cars were purchased from the Portland Company in 1900. Four of the new flat cars and one F&M box car were destroyed when the sawmill burned in 1903. Coach #2 and combination #3 were built in a joint order with an identical coach (SR #8) for the Sandy River Railroad.

In 1906 a temporary trestle was constructed over the Carrabassett River to the Hammond Field log yard where timber from the west side of the river was loaded for transport to the Bigelow sawmill.  Log trains shuttled back and forth to the sawmill until the trestle washed out in November 1907.  Logging service was rough on equipment, and 22 F&M flat cars were scrapped the following year.  A crude passenger shelter was constructed adjacent to the main line for woodsmen involved in the logging.  Rapid transformation of the landscape during this brief period of activity evoked memories of a local American Civil War veteran who named the shelter Shiloh Number Two.

F&M locomotives were renumbered in 1905 to avoid confusion with Sandy River locomotives frequently working on the F&M.  The F&M was merged into the Sandy River and Rangeley Lakes Railroad (SR&RLRR or SR&RL) in 1908.  The Maine Central Railroad took control of the SR&RL in 1911.

F&M combination #1 became SR&RL #11

F&M coach #2 became SR&RL #21

F&M combination #3 became SR&RL #14

F&M baggage #4 became SR&RL #6 (but was scrapped and replaced by a new baggage-RPO #6 in 1912)

Fifteen of the  flat cars built in 1900 were renumbered for SR&RL; but the remaining F&M freight cars were scrapped by 1911

Geography 
Milepost 0: Strong - Connection with the Sandy River Railroad.

Milepost 1.0: Starbird's sawmill.

Milepost 6.2: Summit - Passing siding and covered water tank at the high point between Strong and Kingfield.

Milepost 8.0: Salem - Agent's station and sawmill.  The original covered station burned in 1899 and was replaced with a new building in 1901.

Milepost 10.2: Mount Abram Junction - Branch line to Soule's sawmill.

Milepost 14.9: Kingfield - Covered agent's station, 3-stall enginehouse, and hardwood turning mills.

Milepost 19.2: Bridge over Carrabassett River.  (on K&DR extension)

Milepost 21.5: Hammond Field.  One-half mile branch line to a log loading yard.  (on K&DR extension)

Milepost 24.1: Carrabassett - Agent's station with stage connections to Stratton and Eustis until railroad extended to Bigelow. (on K&DR extension)

Milepost 30.2: Bigelow - Agent's station and sawmill  (on K&DR extension)

Locomotives

Notes

References
 
 
 
 
 
 
  1895, 1896, 1897, 1898, 1899, 1900, 1901, 1902, 1903, 1904, 1905, 1906, 1907, 1908, 1909, 1910, and 1911

External links 
 Brian Carter's Train History

Defunct Maine railroads
Logging railroads in the United States
Predecessors of the Sandy River and Rangeley Lakes Railroad
Narrow gauge railroads in Maine
2 ft gauge railways in the United States
Railway companies established in 1884
Railway companies disestablished in 1908
1884 establishments in Maine
1908 disestablishments in Maine
1908 mergers and acquisitions